Angelo J. "The Hook" LaPietra (October 30, 1920– March 28, 1999) was a Chicago mobster and member of the Chicago Outfit, involved in extensive loansharking operations in the city's First Ward during the 1970s and 1980s. He earned his nickname "The Hook" due to the way he murdered his victims—those that did not, or could not pay up. He would take his victim—bound and gagged—and hang him on a meat hook, (piercing the victim's rib cage with the meat hook) and then torture him to death with a blow-torch. The torch would not actually be the cause of death. The victims most often died from suffocation.

Early crimes 
He was born to first-generation immigrants from Naples, Italy. A high-ranking member of the Chicago Outfit, LaPietra had an extensive criminal record stretching back to 1939 that included murder, kidnapping and narcotics. He was involved in criminal operations in the suburb of Cicero, Illinois, as well as in Chicago's First Ward, LaPietra was a top enforcer under Outfit boss Joseph "Joey Doves" Aiuppa for Cicero criminal operations. As the result of a five-year federal investigation into organized crime following the murder of a small-time Kansas City, Missouri mobster, LaPietra was indicted along with Aiuppa, Jackie "The Lackey" Cerone, and other fifteen mobsters from five cities.

LaPietra was later accused by a Kansas City grand jury with skimming an estimated $2 million from syndicate-controlled Las Vegas casinos. Federal authorities further charged that, by using money from the Teamsters Union Central States Pension Fund, the mobsters were able to consolidate their control over some Las Vegas casinos during the 1950s and 1960s. Federal agents had also recorded at least 12,000 hours of phone conversations through wire taps from organized crime figures in Kansas, Missouri, Milwaukee, Wisconsin, Illinois and Nevada, over a period of four years.

In July 1984, LaPietra's attorney Louis Carbonara requested to federally appointed Judge Joseph A. Stephens, Jr. to have the tapes be transcribed and made available for the defendants. However, due to opposition from Chief David B.B. Helfrey, the U.S. Department of Justice's Organized Crime Strike Force in Kansas City, Missouri refused to transcribe the tapes claiming the difficulties regarding the numerous jurisdictions involved in wiretapping. This issue, among other factors, caused a series of continuances and delays as the case continued for two years and, by September 1985, was called by law enforcement officials as one of the longest in 20 years of prosecution into organized crime. While in prison in Connecticut (1988), he was disciplined and moved to a more secure prison in Virginia. His soldiers "Shorty" and brother Jimmy were caught smuggling in his favorite Italian food from Chicago.

Guilty plea and imprisonment
On January 21, 1986, Aiuppa, Cerone and La Pietra pleaded guilty to conspiring to conceal ownership in a syndicate-controlled Las Vegas casino. La Pietra was sentenced to 16 years imprisonment and fined $143,409 (Aiuppa and Cerone were sentenced to 28½ years imprisonment and fined $43,000 and $430,324 respectively).

In October 1996 the 25th Ward Alderman Danny Solis (appointed by Mayor Richard M. Daley) presented La Pietra a plaque and award for his leadership and commitment to the community. It recognized him and the Italian Club as "decision makers".

Death
In 1999, LaPietra died of natural causes a few short years after his release from prison. He is buried along with many other mobsters at Queen of Heaven Cemetery in Hillside, a Western Suburb of Chicago.

References

Sources
Devito, Carlo. The Encyclopedia of International Organized Crime. New York: Facts On File Inc., 2005.

External links
Chicago "Outfit" Organizational Chart 
Angelo LaPietra Mafia News Archive on TheChicagoSyndicate.com
IHO imposing Trusteeship on the Chicago District Council
Chicago Sun Times: The New 'Outfit' by Steve Warmbir

1920 births
1999 deaths
American gangsters of Sicilian descent
Chicago Outfit mobsters